This is a list of notable footballers who have played for Everton. Generally, this means players that have played 100 or more first-team matches for the club. A number of other players who have played an important role in a league title win have also been included for their  – for example Andy Gray.
Players in Everton's early history are also included despite not necessarily playing 100 matches.

For a list of all Everton players, major or minor, with a Wikipedia article, see Category:Everton F.C. players, and for the current squad see the main Everton F.C. article.

Players are listed according to the date of their first team debut. Appearances and goals are for first-team competitive matches only; wartime matches are excluded. Substitute appearances included.

Notable Players
Appearance figures as of 21 May 2022

Club captains
 
 

Since 1888, 48 players have held the position of club captain for Everton. The club's first captain was Nick Ross, who captained Everton during the 1888-89 season. The longest-serving captain is Peter Farrell, who was club captain for 9 years – from 1948 to 1957. Despite his long tenure, Peter Farrell never won a trophy at Everton. Kevin Ratcliffe, who captained Everton during their most successful period in history, is Everton's most decorated captain. He won 7 trophies as captain, including 2 First Division titles, 4 Charity Shields, and 1 Cup Winners' Cup. Everton's current captain is Séamus Coleman. He has been captain since Phil Jagielka left the club in 2019.

References

External links
 Soccerbase
 Player Galleries at efchistory.co.uk
 Everton: 1946/47 – 2013/14 at the Post War English & Scottish Football League Player's 
 Everton club captain history
Transfer Database 
 ToffeeWeb

Players
 
Everton
Players
Association football player non-biographical articles